GKJ may refer to:
 Golokganj railway station, in Assam, India
 Javanese Christian Church
 Port Meadville Airport, in Pennsylvania, United States